Karimganj Junction railway station serves the Indian city of Karimganj in Assam. It belongs to Lumding railway division of Northeast Frontier Railway zone. It is located in Karimganj district. It is the second biggest railway station in Karimganj District, after . It is also one of the three railway stations serving the city of Karimganj, the others being Longai and New Karimganj. It is one of the oldest railway station in India built under Assam Bengal Railway. It is the main railway station of Karimganj Town. It consists of two platforms with a total of 12 halting trains. The station consists of a single diesel line.

History 
The station was first inaugurated in 1898 under Assam Bengal Railway. Assam Bengal Railway was incorporated in 1892 to serve British-owned tea plantations in Assam. Assam Bengal Railway had III sections & Karimganj Junction come under Section I named as Comilla–Akhaura–Kulaura–Badarpur section opened in 1896–1898 and finally extended to Lumding in 1903.

Post gauge conversion 
After gauge conversion, the station is connected to Tripura via the newly constructed New Karimganj railway station.
Following the construction of the New Karimganj railway station, railway traffic into Karimganj Junction has drastically reduced. All long-distance trains, including the Kanchenjunga Express, Humsafar Express, Rajdhani Express, Tripura Sundari Express, and Deoghar–Agartala Weekly Express, bypass the Karimganj Junction completely by short halting and passing through the New Karimganj railway station, instead.

Station facilities 
The station contains two platforms serving several passengers. It also contains retiring rooms or passenger waiting rooms with proper sanitation facilities. The station is also upgraded with reservation facilities through ticket counters in the year 2003. Karimganj Junction is also upgraded with RailTel free WiFi facilities.

Major trains 
 Agartala–Silchar Express
 Silchar–Dharmanagar Passenger
 Dullabcherra–Silchar Fast Passenger
 Badarpur–Dullabcherra Passenger
 Maishashan–Silchar Passenger

Gallery

See also 
Railway junctions in India

References

External links 
NFR official website
IRCTC official website
Indian Railways official website
IRFCA website
Railway Ministry official website

Railway stations in Karimganj district
Lumding railway division
Karimganj